A genetic lineage, also known as genetic pedigree, is a series of mutations or changes in the genetic code which connect an ancestor's genetic code to their descendant's genetic code. These pieces of genetic code can be categorized in several different sizes as alleles, haplotypes, or haplogroups. A genetic lineage is different from an evolutionary lineage because a genetic lineage applies to a specific area of genetic code or locus while an evolutionary lineage applies to the organism as a whole. 

In cases where the genetic tree is very bushy, the order of mutations in the lineage is mostly known. For example, the order of mutations between E1b1b and E1b1b1a1a for the human Y-chromosomesal L0 or L1 nodes.

A genetic lineage is different from an evolutionary lineage because a genetic lineage applies to a specific area of genetic code or locus while an evolutionary lineage applies to the organism as a whole. For example, the ancient African ape evolved into the gorilla-chimpanzee-human ancestor, which further evolved into the chimpanzee-human ancestor and then to humans. While most human lineages coalesce with chimpanzee lineages, which then converge with gorilla lineages, a few human lineages coalesce with gorilla lineages and then converge with chimpanzee lineages (or chimpanzee lineages that coalesce with gorilla lineages and then converge with human lineages). This occurs because speciation splits evolutionary lineages in non-discrete events that involve 10s to 10000s of individuals in each developing taxon.

Basal lineage
In genetics, a basal lineage is a genetic lineage that connects a variant allele (type) possessed by a more common ancestor that evolves into two descendant variants possessed by a branch ancestor. An example of a basal lineage is the lineage between mitochondrial 'Eve' and L0 or L1. Basal lineages may have types that are no longer represented in the extant population, only being defined by derivative types such as CRS for L1.

Peripheral lineage
Peripheral lineage also known as surface lineage, are lineages in which interconnect an extant type to a branch ancestor.

References

Mutation